Abattoir is a 2016 American horror film directed by Darren Lynn Bousman and starring Dayton Callie, Jessica Lowndes, Joe Anderson, Lin Shaye, and Jay Huguley. It was written by Christopher Monfette. It premiered at the Los Angeles Film Festival on June 7, 2016.

Premise
A real estate reporter investigates Jebediah Crone (Dayton Callie), a mysterious old man who is assembling a haunted house constructed from rooms where deaths have occurred.

Cast 

 Dayton Callie
 Jessica Lowndes
 Joe Anderson
 Lin Shaye
 Jay Huguley

Production
Production for the film began in 2014. It was announced in October 2014 that Joe Anderson, Dayton Callie, Jessica Lowndes and Lin Shaye had been cast.

Reception
Abattoir has received negative reviews. Rotten Tomatoes gives the film a 35% approval rating with twenty reviews counted, with an average score of 4.69/10. Metacritic gave the film a 40 which illustrates "mixed or average".

Brian Tallerico writing for RogerEbert.com gave the film a half star calling it "one of the most baffling and ineffective horror films of the year." Dennis Harvey, writing for Variety, found the film lacking in focus saying "In the end, Abattoir feels like a confused rehash of ideas from the variable likes of The Shining, House on Haunted Hill, Thirteen Ghosts and other haunted-house movies, albeit one so misjudged that it doesn’t even get to the house itself until the last 20 minutes or so. If there were potential here, it’s been garbled in translation."

On the other hand, John DeFore of The Hollywood Reporter called it "A pulpy supernatural tale dripping with atmosphere."

John Squires of Bloody Disgusting called the film "one of the most original horror movies to come out in the last several years."

Comic book prequel
In 2010, Darren Bousman developed a comicbook prequel to the film from Radical Studios. The six-issue miniseries was written by Rob Levin and Troy Peteri, with art by Bing Cansino. Bousman outlined his plans with, "I want to create a universe, and this is the beginning of a universe. I don’t foresee using the comic book to be what the movie is. But it’s part of the world of what the movie will exist in, and everything will stand on its own. For example, the comic book will be its own world, its own movie, its own book, its own story. The movie will be its own world, its own story, but they will all connect. All pieces of this thing connect and tell a much bigger tale...  think it’s important to lead into the movie. We came up with this as a script, as a feature film idea, but what we wanted to accomplish in the feature film was way, way, way too ambitious for a 90-minute movie. So we had to backtrack and set the world up that way."

Sequel
A sequel to Abattoir titled The Dwelling was announced in May 2016, with Bousman set to write and direct and Callie to reprise his role as Jebediah Crone.

References

External links
 

Films directed by Darren Lynn Bousman
American haunted house films
2016 horror films
2010s English-language films
2010s American films